Watford F.C. Under-23s and Academy is the youth setup of Watford. The Under-23 team is effectively Watford's second-string side, but is limited to three outfield players and one goalkeeper over the age of 23 per game following the introduction of new regulations from the 2012–13 season. The Under-18 side is the most senior team in the Academy.

Home fixtures are contested at the UCL Sports Ground, based in Bell Lane, Shenley, Hertfordshire.

Players
Players who will qualify as under-21s in season 2022–23 (i.e. born on or after 1 January 2001) and who are outside the first-team squad. Players born after 1 September 2004 are scholars, who can play for the under-18 team.

Overseas loan group

References

External links
 Watford Under-23s at watfordfc.com
 Watford Under-18s at watfordfc.com

Professional Development League
Watford F.C.
Football academies in England